Vongsa is a surname. Notable people with the surname include:

Phandouangchit Vongsa (born 1942), Laotian politician
Sourigna Vongsa (died 1694), Laotian royalty